Risk and reward may refer to:
 The risk–return spectrum in investments
 Risk/Reward a 2003 film
 Risk and reward (gaming), a mechanic in gaming
 "Risk and Reward", an episode of The Good Doctor